"Set 'Em Up Joe" is a song co-written and recorded by American country music artist Vern Gosdin.  It was released in April 1988 as the second single from the album Chiseled in Stone.  The song was Gosdin's second number one on the country chart.  The single went to number one for one week and spent a total of fifteen weeks within the Top 40. Gosdin wrote the song with Dean Dillon, Buddy Cannon and Hank Cochran.

Content
The song was a tribute to country music legend Ernest Tubb.

Cover versions
The song was covered by Jamey Johnson on his 2010 album The Guitar Song.

Charts

Weekly charts

Year-end charts

References

1988 singles
1988 songs
Vern Gosdin songs
Jamey Johnson songs
Songs written by Hank Cochran
Songs written by Dean Dillon
Songs written by Buddy Cannon
Songs written by Vern Gosdin
Song recordings produced by Bob Montgomery (songwriter)
Columbia Records singles